Royal Treasure is a 2016 Chinese comedy-thriller film spun off from the variety show Go Fighting!. It is directed by Yan Min and Ren Jing and stars Huang Bo, Sun Honglei, Huang Lei, Show Lo, Wang Xun, Lay Zhang, Zanilia Zhao, and Yu Hewei. It was released in China on January 15, 2016.

Plot
Huang Bo, Sun Honglei, Huang Lei, Show Lo, Wang Xun and Lay Zhang are filming the variety show Go Fighting! when a meteoroid suddenly strikes them, sending them back in time to the Ming dynasty (1368-1644). They meet the emperor, and just before his death, he leaves the legacy of the Order of the Holy Flame to them. They then return to the modern civilization and begin their journey of searching for the royal treasure.

Cast
 Huang Bo as himself
 Sun Honglei as himself
 Huang Lei as himself
 Show Lo as himself
 Wang Xun as himself
 Lay Zhang as himself
 Zanilia Zhao as the Ming dynasty princess
 Yu Hewei as the Ming dynasty emperor.

Production
This film was shot in Heshun Town of Tengchong, Yunnan.

Music
 A Man's Job, lyrics by Wang Zhengyu and Wen Ya, composed by Peng Fei, sung by Huang Bo, Sun Honglei, Huang Lei, Show Lo, Wang Xun and Lay Zhang. The song was later used as a theme song for Season 2 of Go Fighting!.

Release
The film was released on January 15, 2015 in China.

Box office
The film's opening day gross was ¥30.994 million and took ¥77.1 million in its first week.

References

External links
 
 
 

2016 films
Treasure hunt films
Chinese comedy thriller films
Films shot in Yunnan
Films set in the Ming dynasty
2010s comedy thriller films
2016 thriller films
2016 comedy films